Rob Martinus van Dam is a Dutch-American nutrition researcher who serves as a professor in the Department of Exercise and Nutrition Sciences in the Milken Institute School of Public Health at George Washington University. He was educated at Wageningen University and the Vrije Universiteit Amsterdam in the Netherlands. Before joining George Washington University in 2021, he was on the faculty of the Vrije Universiteit Amsterdam, the Harvard T.H. Chan School of Public Health and Harvard Medical School, and the Saw Swee Hock School of Public Health and Yong Loo Lin School of Medicine at the National University of Singapore. In 2018, he was recognized as an ISI Highly Cited Researcher.

References

External links
Faculty page

Living people
Dutch emigrants to the United States
American nutritionists
Vrije Universiteit Amsterdam alumni
Wageningen University and Research alumni
Harvard School of Public Health faculty
George Washington University faculty
Academic staff of the National University of Singapore
Academic staff of Vrije Universiteit Amsterdam
Year of birth missing (living people)